José Rizal is a 1998 Philippine historical drama film directed by Marilou Diaz-Abaya and starring Cesar Montano as José Rizal. The film was based on the true story of Filipino patriot José Rizal, who was imprisoned under the Spanish colonization and tells Rizal's story until the final day of his execution.

The film was an official entry to the 1998 Metro Manila Film Festival, swept most of the nominations with seventeen awards, making it the first film with the most MMFF award wins.

Plot
José Rizal is imprisoned in Fort Santiago due to his dissident activities. Meanwhile, in a small Balintawak field, Andrés Bonifacio and his fellow secret organization, the Katipunan, commence the uprising against the tyranny created by the Spaniards by tearing their cédulas as a sign of freedom from Spanish slavery.

Soon, a first lieutenant of the Artillery, Luis Taviel de Andrade, visits Rizal. Taviel de Andrade does not waste time to study carefully Rizal's case. In just a short period, Rizal and Taviel captured each other's sympathy and eventually became friends as they had usual meetings in Rizal's cell in Fort Santiago. Taviel was even able to celebrate Christmas with Rizal in the cell where they drink and sing together. In addition, Governor General Ramón Blanco also sympathizes with Rizal's cause but is later secretly ousted by corrupt Spanish officials and Manila's archbishop, who replace him with Camilo de Polavieja.

Flashbacks of Rizal's life are shown, from his childhood to his education, until his professional life as a doctor. He soon begins writing his two novels Noli Me Tángere and El Filibusterismo, which are then published. In addition, key scenes from the two novels are also shown.

After Christmas, Rizal was sent to the Real Audiencia, the colonial court of appeal, to hear the trial against him. Soon after, the magistrates decided to condemn him to the firing squad on the 30th of the morning in Luneta.

On the night before the execution, Rizal hallucinates, seeing his alter ego—protagonist, "Simoun" (the former Crisostomo Ibarra), from his second book, El Filibusterismo, tempting him to change the climax of the novel.

On the morning of his execution, his kin receives a small alcohol stove (not a gas lamp as commonly portrayed) from his cell containing the last poem "Mi último adiós". Stopping at the place of execution facing the rising sun, Rizal requests the authorities for him to face the firing squad, but the request is denied. Calm and without haste, he requests to have his head spared instead and the captain agrees. At the moment the firing squad aims at his back, he utters his final words: Consummatum est ("It is done").

In the events following Rizal's execution, members of the Katipunan begin their armed uprising, completely catching the Spanish forces off guard, seizing their mounts, munitions, and rifles. After that, the organization captures a church and the members execute the friars in an act of vengeance. Later that night, Bonifacio and his top generals meet in their headquarters to plan a new offensive seeking to capture ten towns in one week from the Spaniards. As Bonifacio continues speaking, the camera pans to Rizal's picture at the wall of his headquarters before revealing Rizal's hat which sat by the shores of Manila Bay, concluding with the text of events that transpired after his death.

Cast

Main cast
Cesar Montano as José Rizal
Dominic Guinto as young José Rizal
Chin Chin Gutierrez as Josephine Bracken
Mickey Ferriols as Leonor Rivera

Rizal's family

Ronnie Lazaro as Francisco Mercado
Gloria Díaz as Teodora Alonso
Pen Medina as Paciano Mercado
Ping Medina as young Paciano
Gina Alajar as Saturnina Rizal
Tanya Gomez as Narcisa Rizal
Tess Dumpit as María Rizal
Irma Adlawan as Lucía Rizal
Angie Castrence as Josefa Rizal
Rowena Basco as Trinidad Rizal
Kaye Marie June Congmon as Soledad Rizal

The Spaniards

Bon Vibar as Governor-General Ramón Blanco
Subas Herrero as Lt. Enrique de Alcocer 
Tony Mabesa as Governor-General Camilo de Polavieja
Alexis Santaren as Col. Francisco Olívè
Archie Adamos as Col. Olívè's aide
Ryan Eigenmann as Fernando (Spanish classmate at UST)
Jaime Fábregas as Luís Taviel de Andrade

The Dominicans
Peque Gallaga as Archbishop Bernardino Nozaleda, O.P.
Tony Carreón as a Dominican friar (Gomburza execution)
Fritz Infante as a Dominican friar (professor at UST)

The Jesuits
Chiqui Xerxes-Burgos as Father José Villaclara, S.J.
Shelby Payne as Father Estanislao March, S.J.
Minco Fábregas as Father Francisco de Paula Sanchez, S.J.

Other friars
Ogie Juliano as Padre Rodríguez
Jon Achával as Friar 1
Cloyd Robinson as Friar 2
Marco Zabaleta as Friar 3

The Filipinos

Jhong Hilario as Rizal's prison servant
Gardo Versoza as Andrés Bonifacio
Marco Sison as Pio Valenzuela
Joel Lamangan as a gobernadorcillo
Nanding Josef as Antonio Rivera
Pocholo Montes as Justiniano Aquino Cruz
Bhey Vito as Don Dorotéo Onjungco
Kidlat Tahimik as a guest (La Liga Filipina meeting)
Toto Natividad as a Katipunan benefactor

The Filipino propagandists

Dennis Marasigan as Marcelo H. del Pilar
Mon Confiado as Mariano Ponce
Gregg de Guzman
Eddie Aquino 
Manolo Barrientos
Rolando Inocencio 
Gilbert Onida
Jim Pebanco
Troy Martino
Kokoy Palma
Richard Merck
Jess Evardone

Noli Me Tángere and El Filibusterismo characters

Joel Torre as Crisóstomo Ibarra/Simoun
Monique Wilson as María Clara
Nonie Buencamino as Elías
Roeder Camañag as Basílio
Richard Quan as Isagani
Cristóbal Gómez as Padre Damaso

Other characters
Jesús Díaz as ophthalmology professor in Spain
Karl Meyer as a Belgian printer
LJ Moreno as Josephine Bracken's companion

Production

Background
In 1994, there were efforts to produce a Hollywood feature film based on the life of José Rizal led by director Cirio H. Santiago, then the head of the Film Development Foundation of the Philippines, with the approval of President Fidel V. Ramos. Actors who were reportedly considered for the project included Andy Garcia as Rizal, Winona Ryder as Josephine Bracken, and Sharon Cuneta as Leonor Rivera, with Jonathan Demme as director, though the project did not come to fruition.

Release
The series was released in DVD-format and VCD format by GMA Records Home Video and distributed by Viva Video.

Accolades
1998 Metro Manila Film Festival
Best Picture
Best Actor (Cesar Montano)
Best Director (Marilou Diaz-Abaya)
Best Supporting Actor (Jaime Fabregas)
Best Supporting Actress (Gloria Diaz)
Best Screenplay (Ricky Lee, Jun Lana and Peter Ong Lim)
Best Original Story (Ricky Lee, Jun Lana and Peter Ong Lim)
Best Cinematography (Rody Lacap)
Best Editing (Jess Navarro and Manet Dayrit)
Best Sound Production (Mike Idioma)
Best Production Design (Leo Abaya)
Best Special Effects (Mark Ambat of Optima Digital)
Best Makeup (Denni Yrastorza Tan)
Best Musical Score (Nonong Buencamino)
Best Movie Theme Song (Nonong Buencamino for "Awit ni Maria Clara")
Best Festival Float
Gatpuno Antonio J. Villegas Cultural Awards1999 FAMAS AwardsBest Picture
Best Actor (Cesar Montano)
Best Director (Marilou Diaz-Abaya)
Best Supporting Actor (Jaime Fabregas)
Best Cinematography (Rody Lacap)
Best Editing (Jess Navarro and Manet A. Dayrit)
Best Movie Theme Song (Nonong Buencamino for "Awit ni Maria Clara")
Best Musical Direction (Nonong Buencamino)
Best Production Design (Leo Abaya)
Best Screenplay (Ricardo Lee, Jun Lana, and Peter Ong Lim)
Best Special Effects (Rolando Santo Domingo)1999 Gawad Urian AwardsBest Direction (Marilou Diaz-Abaya)
Best Cinematography (Rody Lacap)
Best Music (Nonong Buencamino)
Best Production Design (Leo Abaya)
Best Sound (Albert Michael Idioma)
Best Supporting Actor (Jaime Fabregas)1999 Star Awards for Movies'Movie of the Year
Actor of the Year (Cesar Montano)
Director of the Year (Marilou Diaz-Abaya)
Supporting Actor of the Year (Jaime Fabregas)
Adapted Screenplay of the Year (Ricardo Lee, Jun Lana, and Peter Ong Lim)
Editor of the Year (Jess Navarro and Manet A. Dayrit)
Musical Scorer of the Year (Nonong Buencamino)
Production Designer of the Year (Leo Abaya)
Sound Engineering of the Year (Albert Michael Idioma)

The film has been screened and run in the competition in different film festivals worldwide and included in the Official Selection for Panorama at the Berlin International Film Festival (1998). It also won 2nd runner-up in the Audience Award of the Toronto Filmfest and the Chicago International Film Festival.

See alsoBayaning 3rd WorldRizal sa Dapitan''
Propaganda Movement
Philippine Revolution

References

Tenth Anniversary of Jose Rizal Film

Notes

External links

Creative Journal about Jose Rizal

1998 films
 Cultural depictions of Andrés Bonifacio
 Cultural depictions of Governors-General of the Philippines
 Cultural depictions of José Rizal
 GMA Pictures films
José Rizal
 Philippine biographical films
 Philippine historical films
1990s Spanish-language films
 Tagalog-language films
 Films directed by Marilou Diaz-Abaya
 Films set in the 1890s
 Films set in the 1880s